Boulevard des Airs are a French pop/rock group formed in 2004. So far they have published four albums: Paris-Buenos Aires (2011), Les Appareuses trompences (2013), Bruxelles (2015) and Je me dis que toi aussi (2018).

Members
 Jean-Noël Dasque – guitar
 Sylvain Duthu – vocals 
 Florent Dasque – vocals, guitar
 Laurent Garnier – bass
 Jean-Baptiste Labe – trombone
 Mélissa Doya – vocals, saxophone
 Ernst Carree – drums
 Jérémie Plante – piano

Discography

Albums

EPs

Singles

References

French pop music groups
French rock music groups